Eduardo Higareda (born 26 February 1937) is a Mexican equestrian. He competed at the 1964 Summer Olympics, the 1968 Summer Olympics and the 1972 Summer Olympics.

References

External links
 

1937 births
Living people
Mexican male equestrians
Olympic equestrians of Mexico
Equestrians at the 1964 Summer Olympics
Equestrians at the 1968 Summer Olympics
Equestrians at the 1972 Summer Olympics
Pan American Games medalists in equestrian
Pan American Games silver medalists for Mexico
Equestrians at the 1971 Pan American Games
Sportspeople from Mexico City
Medalists at the 1971 Pan American Games